is a Japanese actor, theatre director and voice actor currently affiliated with Engekikurabu Za.

Filmography

Television drama
Yoshitsune (2005)
Onward Towards Our Noble Deaths (2007) (The chief of staff)

Theatre
Rudolf (2008) (Emperor Franz-Joseph)

Television animation
Crest of the Stars (1999) (Narrator)
Lost Chapter of the Stars: Birth (2000) (Narrator)
Banner of the Stars (2000) (Narrator)
Banner of the Stars II (2001) (Narrator)
X-Men (2011) (Mastermind)
Yu-Gi-Oh! Zexal (2013) (Don Thousand)
One Piece (2017) (Streusen)

Original video animation (OVA)
Sol Bianca: The Legacy (1999) (Gyunter)

Theatrical animation
Case Closed: The Last Wizard of the Century (1999) (Sergei Ovchinnikov)

Video games
Kingdom Hearts II (2005) (Scar, Hector Barbossa)
Lost Odyssey (2007) (Gongora)
God of War III (2010) (Zeus)
Kingdom Hearts III (2019) (Hector Barbossa)

Tokusatsu
 Ressha Sentai ToQger (xxxx) (General Schwarz)
 Heisei Rider vs. Shōwa Rider: Kamen Rider Taisen feat. Super Sentai (xxxx) (General Schwarz)
 Ressha Sentai ToQger the Movie: Galaxy Line S.O.S. (xxxx) (General Schwarz)
 Ressha Sentai ToQger vs. Kyoryuger: The Movie (xxxx) (General Schwarz)

Dubbing roles

Live-action
Geoffrey Rush
Shakespeare in Love (Philip Henslowe)
Pirates of the Caribbean: The Curse of the Black Pearl (Hector Barbossa)
Pirates of the Caribbean: Dead Man's Chest (Hector Barbossa)
Pirates of the Caribbean: At World's End (Hector Barbossa)
The King's Speech (Lionel Logue)
Pirates of the Caribbean: On Stranger Tides (Hector Barbossa)
Pirates of the Caribbean: Dead Men Tell No Tales (Hector Barbossa)
J. K. Simmons
Whiplash (Terence Fletcher)
The Accountant (Raymond "Ray" King)
La La Land (Bill)
Counterpart (Howard Silk)
Jeff Bridges
Iron Man (2011 TV Asahi edition) (Obadiah Stane)
Crazy Heart (Otis "Bad" Blake)
R.I.P.D. (Roycephus "Roy" Pulsipher)
24 (Victor Drazen (Dennis Hopper))
Ant-Man and the Wasp (Bill Foster (Laurence Fishburne))
The Assignment (Jack Shaw (Donald Sutherland))
The Autopsy of Jane Doe (Tommy Tilden (Brian Cox))
Bedknobs and Broomsticks (Mr. Emelius Browne (David Tomlinson))
The Big Blue (Enzo Molinari (Jean Reno))
Blood and Wine (Alex Gates (Jack Nicholson))
Changeling (Rev. Gustav Briegleb (John Malkovich))
The Chronicles of Narnia: Prince Caspian (Miraz (Sergio Castellitto))
Con Air (Cyrus "The Virus" Grissom (John Malkovich))
Conan the Barbarian (NTV edition) (Conan (Arnold Schwarzenegger))
The Cook, the Thief, His Wife & Her Lover (Albert Spica (Michael Gambon))
The Cotton Club (Owney Madden (Bob Hoskins))
Entrapment (Conrad Greene (Maury Chaykin))
Executive Decision (Nagi Hassan (David Suchet))
Flood (Deputy Prime Minister Campbell (David Suchet))
Garm Wars: The Last Druid (Wydd (Lance Henriksen))
Justice League (Steppenwolf (Ciarán Hinds))
The King and I (TV Tokyo edition) (King Mongkut of Siam (Yul Brynner))
The Mummy: Tomb of the Dragon Emperor (TV edition) (General Yang (Anthony Wong))
Royal Pains (Boris Kuester von Jurgens-Ratenicz (Campbell Scott))
Star Trek II: The Wrath of Khan (NTV edition) (Captain Clark Terrell (Paul Winfield))
Star Wars: The Force Awakens (Supreme Leader Snoke (Andy Serkis))
Star Wars: The Last Jedi (Supreme Leader Snoke (Andy Serkis))
There Will Be Blood (Daniel Plainview (Daniel Day-Lewis))
Transformers: Dark of the Moon
UC: Undercover (Jack "Sonny" Walker (William Forsythe))
X-Men: The Last Stand (TV edition) (Beast (Kelsey Grammer))
Zack Snyder's Justice League (Steppenwolf (Ciarán Hinds))

Animation
All Dogs Go to Heaven 2 (Red)
Aladdin and the King of Thieves (Sa'luk)
Anastasia (Grigori Rasputin)
Beauty and the Beast: The Enchanted Christmas (Forte)
A Bug's Life (Hopper)
Frankenweenie (Mr. Rzykruski)
Guillermo del Toro's Pinocchio (Podestà)
Help! I'm a Fish (Joe)
House of Mouse (Scar)
Ice Age (Soto)
The Little Prince (The Academy Teacher)
The Lion King (Scar)
The Pebble and the Penguin (Drake)
The Swan Princess II: Escape from Castle Mountain (Clavius the Magic-Shaper) 
Detentionaire (Lee Ping)

Other Japanese
 Pirates of the Caribbean (Hector Barbossa)

References

External links

Japanese male television actors
Japanese male stage actors
Japanese theatre directors
Japanese male voice actors
Male voice actors from Kyoto
Living people
1948 births